The current Malaysian Minister of Economy has been Rafizi Ramli since 3 December 2022. The minister is supported by Deputy Minister of Economy who is currently Hanifah Hajar Taib. The Minister administers the portfolio through the Ministry of Economy.

List of Ministers of Economic Affairs/Economy
The following individuals have held office as Minister of Economic Affairs/Economy:

Political Party:

List of Ministers in the Prime Minister's Department (Economic Planning Unit) 
The following individuals have held office as the Minister in the Prime Minister's Department under the Economic Planning Unit (EPU) department:

Political Party:

See also
 Ministry of Economy (Malaysia)
 Minister of Finance (Malaysia)

References

External links 
 http://www.epu.gov.my/en

 
Lists of government ministers of Malaysia
Malaysia